is a Fuji TV Japanese television drama starring Tomohisa Yamashita, Keiko Kitagawa, and Saki Aibu.

The series primarily focuses on two characters, Naoki Kamiya (Tomohisa Yamashita), a professional basketball player, and Riko Shirakawa (Keiko Kitagawa), an aspiring violinist. Over the course of the series Naoki faces difficulties trying to succeed in the world of basketball, and Riko struggles to become a successful violinist. Eventually the two meet and the series chronicles their relationship and struggles, as well as those of their friends.

Cast
Tomohisa Yamashita as Kamiya Naoki
Keiko Kitagawa as Shirakawa Riko
Saki Aibu as Nanami Natsuki
Shihori Kanjiya as Ebina Mai
Hideaki Itō as Coach Kawasaki Tomoya
Nobuaki Kaneko as Yoyogi Ren
Junpei Mizobata as Hatano Shuji
Munetaka Aoki as Moriguchi Shuto
Satoshi Kanada as Kasukabe Yoshio
Akiyoshi Kawashima as Matsuyama Ryosuke
Masaru Nagai as Utsunomiya Toru
Miki Maya as Kamiya Makiko
Aya Ōmasa as Kamiya Yuri
Ayaka Komatsu as Kanazawa Shion
David M. as Larry Brown (JC ARCS' Foreign Player)
Hakura Kuroki as Fukuda Seiko
Keisuke Kato as Oze Yoichi
Takaki Ishida as Saga Hiroaki
Yumi Sugimoto as Akita Saori
Ayana as Kaori Saeki (JC ARCS' Photographer)
Yasuyuki Maekawa as Yusuke Mishima
Chisun as Kamiya Yukino
Ryuta Kawabata as Yusuke Komaki
Natsumi Ohira as Yuri's friend

External links
 

2009 Japanese television series debuts
2009 Japanese television series endings
Japanese drama television series
Fuji TV dramas